The O'Connor Ministry was the 28th Ministry of the Government of Western Australia, and was led by Liberal Premier Ray O'Connor and his deputy Cyril Rushton. It succeeded the Court Ministry on 25 January 1982, upon the retirement of Sir Charles Court from politics. The ministry was in turn followed by the Burke Ministry on 25 February 1983 after the Liberal Party lost government at the state election held on 19 February.

Overview
Ray O'Connor, who had been in parliament since 1959 and first appointed as a Minister in 1967, had replaced Des O'Neil as Deputy Premier upon the latter's retirement from politics at the 1980 election. On 18 December 1981, Sir Charles Court, then 70 years of age, announced his decision that he would step down as Premier on 25 January 1982. O'Connor was elected unopposed by the party room to replace him.

The final term of the preceding Court Ministry had been somewhat troubled due in part to the inconsistent support of Liberal MLA Dr Tom Dadour and the 1978 split of the National Country Party, with a breakaway National Party maintaining an independent line and holding three seats. A range of issues in several portfolios, most notably Aboriginal affairs and education, had received public prominence.

Of the former Court ministry, 10 of the 13 ministers retained office—Sir Charles Court, Bill Grayden and David Wordsworth resigned, and backbenchers Bob Pike, Jim Clarko and Richard Shalders were promoted. The latter two were initially Honorary Ministers, but were fully promoted on 14 May 1982.

The Ministry

On 25 January 1982, the Governor, Sir Richard Trowbridge, constituted the Ministry. He designated 13 principal executive offices of the Government and appointed the following ministers to their positions, who served until the end of the Ministry on 25 February 1983. Two honorary ministers, Jim Clarko and Richard Shalders, were appointed to assist ministers in various portfolios, and on 14 May 1982, they fully assumed the portfolios. This was done pursuant to the Constitution Acts Amendment Act 1980 (No.5 of 1980), assented on 9 September 1980, which had grown the Ministry from 13 to 15.

The list below is ordered by decreasing seniority within the Cabinet, as indicated by the Government Gazette and the Hansard index. Blue entries indicate members of the Liberal Party, whilst green entries indicate members of the National Country Party. The members of the Ministry were:

References

Western Australian ministries
Ministries of Elizabeth II